This list of ridges and summits of the Allegheny Mountains identifies geographic elevations for about  from north central Pennsylvania, through eastern West Virginia and western Maryland, to western Virginia in the USA. The range of the Allegheny Mountains is part of the Ridge-and-Valley Appalachians, a physiographic region of the much larger Appalachian Mountain Range.

From northeast to southwest, with ridges and summits of the Eastern Continental Divide in italics:

Bald Eagle Mountain, Pennsylvania
Wopsononock Mountain, Pennsylvania
Brush Mountain, Pennsylvania
Pine Knob, Pennsylvania
Blue Knob, Pennsylvania
Tussey Mountain, Pennsylvania
Cattle Knob, Pennsylvania
Round Knob, Pennsylvania
Ritchey Knob, Pennsylvania
Schaefer Head, Pennsylvania
Herman Point, Pennsylvania
Laurel Highlands region (3 counties), Pennsylvania
Laurel Hill
Chestnut Ridge
Wills Mountain, Pennsylvania, Maryland
Laurel Mountain, Pennsylvania, Maryland
Sleepy Creek Mountain, West Virginia
Sideling Hill, West Virginia, Pennsylvania, Maryland
Negro Mountain, Pennsylvania, Maryland
Mount Davis, Pennsylvania

Allegheny Mountain (Pennsylvania) stratigraphic ridge, Pennsylvania
Allegheny Mountain, Bald Knob Summit (Pennsylvania): 2,906 feet
Grand View, MT. Ararat Lookout Point Pennsylvania 40°2′14.66″N 78°45′30.13″W
Savage Mountain (Pennsylvania): 
Savage Mountain stratigraphic ridge, Pennsylvania, Maryland
Big Savage Mountain summit, Pennsylvania: 
Big Savage Mountain summit, Maryland: 
Elbow Mountain, Pennsylvania, Maryland
Allegheny Front (includes Dans Mountain)
Little Allegheny Mountain, Pennsylvania, Maryland
Dan's Mountain, Maryland: 
Backbone Mountain, West Virginia, Maryland
North Mountain, Virginia, West Virginia
Great North Mountain, Virginia, West Virginia
Tonoloway Ridge, Pennsylvania, Maryland, West Virginia
Cacapon Mountain, West Virginia
Third Hill Mountain, West Virginia
Sleepy Creek Mountain, West Virginia
Patterson Creek Mountain, West Virginia
South Branch Mountain, West Virginia
Ice Mountain, West Virginia
Knobly Mountain, West Virginia
Little Snaggy Mountain, Maryland
Snaggy Mountain, West Virginia
Briery Mountains, West Virginia
Laurel Mountain, West Virginia
Rich Mountain, West Virginia
Mount Porte Crayon, West Virginia
Canaan Mountain, West Virginia
Cabin Mountain, West Virginia
Brown Mountain, West Virginia
North Fork Mountain, West Virginia
River Knobs, West Virginia
Shenandoah Mountain, West Virginia, Virginia
Elleber Ridge, West Virginia
Spruce Mountain, West Virginia
Spruce Knob, West Virginia
Little Middle Mountain, West Virginia
Allegheny Mountain, West Virginia, Virginia
Middle Mountain, West Virginia
Little Beech Mountain, West Virginia
Beech Mountain, West Virginia
Little Mountain, West Virginia
Shaver's Fork Mountain Complex, West Virginia
Cheat Mountain
Barton Knob
White Top
Back Allegheny Mountain 
Bald Knob
Shavers Mountain
Gaudineer Knob
Bickle Knob
McGowan Mountain
Elk Mountain
Middle Mountain
Green Mountain
Black Mountain, West Virginia
Gauley Mountain, West Virginia
Yew Mountains, West Virginia
Back Creek Mountain, Virginia
Peters Mountain, West Virginia, Virginia

See also 
List of mountains of the Appalachians

Alleghenies
Alleghenies
Alleghenies